Tårnby Kommune is a municipality (Danish, kommune) bordering Copenhagen Municipality on the island of Amager just east of Zealand (Sjælland) in eastern Denmark. The municipality includes the islands of Saltholm (16 km2;2 inhabitants 1 January 2020) and Peberholm (1.3 km2), and covers an area of 64.95 km2 of which 48.9 on Amager. It has a population of 42,723 (1. January 2022). Its mayor is Allan S. Andersen, a member of the Social Democrats (Socialdemokraterne) political party.

Overview

The municipality is primarily an amalgamation of the formerly independent towns of Tårnby and Kastrup, as well as the earlier villages of  Ullerup and Tømmerup. The municipal council is located in the Kastrup section of the municipality. Tårnby municipality was not merged with other municipalities on 1 January 2007 as part of nationwide Kommunalreformen ("The Municipal Reform" of 2007).

Tårnby is divided into three main built up districts: Kastrup, Tårnby, and Vestamager. Kastrup in the north-east is marked by higher density apartments and harbour facilities; Tårnby, west of Kastrup, is known for its older houses, row houses, and some apartments; Vestamager, to the west of the airport, is known for its smaller houses and gardens. Most of the community's infrastructure is fairly evenly spread throughout the municipality.

Neighbouring municipalities are Copenhagen to the north and Dragør to the south. These three municipalities cover the entirety of Amager island. To the east is the Øresund (the Sound), the strait which separates Zealand from Sweden. To the west is Køge Bay (Køge Bugt).

The E20 Amager Motorway (Amagermotorvejen) / Øresund Motorway (Øresundsmotorvejen) runs through Tårnby, where in the east it crosses over the Øresund and over the island of Peberholm to Sweden as the Øresund Bridge, and to the west it crosses over Køge Bay to Avedøre Holme in Hvidovre municipality as the 241-meter long Kalvebod Bridge (Kalvebodbroen).

Most of Copenhagen Airport lies in the municipality. In fact, the airport takes up about 19% of the municipality's area. The airport has had a strong impact on the area, as the national significance of the international airport has sometimes taken precedence over local wishes. However, the airport is also a major employer and benefit for the local economy.

Demographically, Tårnby is slightly older than most of Copenhagen. This trend is expected to become more pronounced in the coming years. Income is slightly less than the average of the approximately 20 municipalities closest to the municipality of Copenhagen.

Politically the municipality has been very stable. From the 1930s until the early 21st century there were only 4 different mayors, all social democrats. The town council has always a majority of social democrats. The municipality has the 5th. lowest tax rate in Denmark. However, the service level is still relatively high.

The first mention of Tårnby in the historical record was in 1135.

Much of the community was still quite rural until the mid 20th century when expansion of the airport, construction of new highways and streets, and a population boom in Copenhagen encouraged the construction of apartments and row housing.

Economy
Scandinavian Airlines System SAS Cargo and SAS Denmark have their offices in Kastrup. Transavia Denmark also has its head office in Kastrup.

When SAS Commuter operated its head office was in Kastrup. When Danair operated, its head office was also in Kastrup.

Politics

Municipal council
Tårnby's municipal council consists of 19 members, elected every four years.

Below are the municipal councils elected since the Municipal Reform of 2007.

Notable people
 Niki Zimling (born 1985), footballer

Culture
Kastrupgård Collection

References

 Municipal statistics: NetBorger Kommunefakta, delivered from KMD aka Kommunedata (Municipal Data)
 Municipal mergers and neighbors: Eniro new municipalities map

External links

Municipality's official website 
Engelsk Version 
Portal for Tårnby

 
Municipalities in the Capital Region of Denmark
Municipalities of Denmark
Copenhagen metropolitan area